The Women's Victorian Open is an annual golf tournament held in Australia. It was founded in 1988 and played annually through 1992. After a 20-year hiatus it returned in 2012 as a tournament on the WPGA Tour of Australasia.

This was the first time the men's Victorian Open and women's Victorian Open were held concurrently - making it the only professional golf tournament in the world where men and women played the same courses, at the same time, for equal prize money.

In 2013, the men's and women's Victorian Opens moved to 13th Beach Golf Links in Barwon Heads, southwest of Melbourne, near the southwest shore  of the 

When the tournament moved to 13th Beach Golf Links in 2013, the combined prize pool was A$300,000, with $150,000 on offer for each of the men's and women's fields.

In six years, the total prize pool has increased ten-fold, with the 2019 men's and women's Victorian Open fields to be playing for a total purse of $3 million ($1.5 million each).

Since 2017, the event became co-sanctioned by the Ladies European Tour and the ALPG Tour. Like its men's counterpart, it is a two-cut tournament. The field is reduced to 60 after the second round and 35 after the third round; those who fail to make the second cut earn prize money.

In 2019, the event was co-sanctioned by the LPGA Tour, and will continue to be played alongside the men's Victorian Open, now co-sanctioned by the European Tour. The double cut continues; 65 players will remain after the first cut, then 35 players after the Saturday cut.

Winners

As an LPGA Tour event

In 2017 Reid beat Sandra Gal at the third hole of a sudden-death playoff and in 2018, Minjee Lee won her second Victorian Open title, after winning her first as an amateur in 2014.

See also
Victorian Open – (concurrent men's tournament)

References

External links

Coverage on the LPGA Tour's official site
Coverage on the ALPG Tour's official site
13th Beach Golf Links – official site

ALPG Tour events
Former LPGA Tour events
Former Ladies European Tour events
Golf tournaments in Australia
Sports competitions in Victoria (Australia)
Recurring sporting events established in 1988
1988 establishments in Australia